T22 may refer to:

Aircraft 
 Avro Anson T 22, a British radio trainer
 Consolidated AT-22, a trainer of the United States Army Air Forces
 De Havilland Sea Vampire T.22, a British jet trainer
 Fokker T-22 Instructor, a trainer of the Brazilian Air Force
 Junkers T.22, a German prototype fighter
 Ryan PT-22 Recruit, a trainer of the United States Army Air Corps

Rail and transit 
 Baraki-nakayama Station, in Funabashi, Chiba, Japan
 Furutakamatsu-Minami Station, in Takamatsu, Kagawa, Japan
 Temmabashi Station, in Chūō-ku, Osaka, Japan

Other uses 
 T22 (rocket), an American rocket weapon
 Estonian national road 22
 
 T22 Armored Car, a prototype of the M8 Greyhound light armored car
 T22 Medium Tank, an American prototype tank
 ThinkPad T22, a notebook computer
 Type 22 frigate of the Royal Navy